Glières-Val-de-Borne is a commune in the Haute-Savoie department in the Auvergne-Rhône-Alpes region in south-eastern France. It was established on 1 January 2019 by merger of the former communes of Le Petit-Bornand-les-Glières (the seat) and Entremont.

See also
Communes of the Haute-Savoie department

References

Communes of Haute-Savoie
2019 establishments in France
Populated places established in 2019